The  is a station wagon manufactured by Nissan Motors from 1997 to 2001. According to Nissan, the name derives from "packaging renaissance for versatile, spacious comfort on wheels."

It was produced by Nissan from October 1997 to July 2001, and competed with the Mitsubishi RVR and the Honda HR-V. Powering the 2WD models was the SR20DE engine, The X and G models with a 4WD specification were fitted with the KA24DE engine. The GT Turbo model came with the SR20DET engine and was AWD. In Japan, it was exclusive to Nissan Satio Store Japanese dealerships.

Nissan Altra

The batteries were installed beneath the floor.

The Nissan Altra was an electric car produced by Nissan Motors between 1998 and 2002.   The Nissan Altra was introduced at the Los Angeles International Auto Show on 29 December 1997.  Nissan described the Altra as a combination of a sedan, SUV, and minivan. It was mainly used as a fleet vehicle for companies such as electric utilities.  Only about 200 vehicles were ever produced. It used the bodystyle of the Nissan R'nessa.

Technologically, the Altra was significant as being the first production electric vehicle to use a lithium-ion battery  (li-ion) battery. Nissan called this a third-generation battery (after lead–acid and nickel–metal hydride) and chose li-ion primarily for its power density. It was managed by a passive system, ensuring the batteries never reach charge levels outside their recommended zones. The Altra had a permanent magnet synchronous motor, controlled by a 32-bit RISC computer. It had other more typical features, such as keyless entry, power mirrors and windows, a 4-wheel anti-lock braking system, and regenerative braking.

References

R'nessa
Crossover sport utility vehicles
Vehicles with CVT transmission
All-wheel-drive vehicles
Front-wheel-drive vehicles
Electric cars
Production electric cars
Cars introduced in 1997
CARB's ZEV Mandate
2000s cars